Seven Arhat is a 2010 Chinese action comedy film directed and produced by Fu Huayang and written by Ning Caishen. The film stars Eric Tsang, Chen Sicheng, Wang Hao, Zhang Zhen, Jia Huijing, Wang Jing, and Zhao Yilong. It picks up the story of Master Xiuxiu and his seven disciples protecting the treasure in the Buddhist temple. The film premiered in China on July 23, 2010.

Plot
Master Xiuxiu (Eric Tsang) and his seven disciples lives in a Buddhist temple in a deep mountain. The temple preserves a golden armour of Xiang Yu. On weekdays, Master Xiuxiu and his seven disciples practise Shaolin Boxing.

One day, Master Xiuxiu goes downhill to cure a patient. The Gang of Four, namely the "Nine Tattooed Dragons", "Xiaowu", the "eccentric scientist" and "Big Fool", come to the temple to capture the golden armour. They suffered a crushing defeat at the hands of the seven disciples. In desperation, the "Nine Tattooed Dragons" demolished the temple and takes Fa as the hostage. Then he flees to the cave where the golden armour hide. After putting on the golden armour he thinks he is invulnerable. But he is defeated by the seven disciples.

Cast
 Eric Tsang as Master Xiuxiu
 Chen Sicheng as Nine Tattooed Dragons
 Wang Hao as Duo
 Zhang Zhen as Lai
 Jia Huijing as Mi
 Wang Jing as Fa
 Zhao Yilong as Suo
 Wang Yidong as La
 Fu Jiayuan as Xi
 Niu Mengmeng as Xiaowu
 Wang dongfang as the eccentric scientist 
 Ma Jian as Big Fool

Production
According to director Fu Huayang's statement, the film pays homage to Akira Kurosawa's Seven Samurai.

The film took place in Mount Song of Henan.

Release
The film was released on 23 July 2010 in China.

Reception
The film received mainly negative reviews. Douban gave the film 4.9 out of 10.

Box office
The film's opening day gross was 1.56 million yuan ($0.24 million), and earned a total of 5.18 million yuan ($0.8179 million) on its first weekend.

References

External links
 
 
 

2010 films
Chinese action comedy films
Kung fu films
Films shot in Henan
Films directed by Fu Huayang
2010s Mandarin-language films